Colobathristidae is a family of true bugs in the order Hemiptera. There are more than 20 genera and 90 described species in Colobathristidae.

Genera
These 26 genera belong to the family Colobathristidae:

 Brachyphyma Horvath, 1904
 Bradaloria Stys & Henry, 2015
 Calliseidus Horvath, 1904
 Carvalhoia Kormilev, 1951
 Centromus Bergroth, 1910
 Colobasiastes Breddin, 1903
 Colobathristes Burmeister, 1835
 Dayakiella Horvath, 1922
 Diascopoea Horvath, 1904
 Diplodontella Horvath, 1922
 Discocentrus Horvath, 1922
 Elopura Horvath, 1922
 Molybditis Bergroth, 1910
 Narcegaster Horvath, 1904
 Neocolobrathristes Kormilev, 1951
 Neolabradoria Stys & Henry, 2015
 Paraelopura Kormilev, 1953
 Parathristes Carvalho & Henry, 1986
 Peruda Distant, 1888
 Perudella Kormilev, 1949
 Phaenacantha Horvath, 1904
 Piptocentrus Horvath, 1904
 Schuhacantha Stys & Exnerova, 2012
 Symphylax Horvath, 1904
 Taphrocranum Horvath, 1904
 Trichocentrus Horvath, 1904

References

Further reading

 
 
 

Lygaeoidea
Heteroptera families